Shamsabad is a Pakistani village which is sited in Attock District of Punjab, Pakistan

References

Villages in Attock District